Mostafa Anwar (born 1 January 1982) is an Egyptian fencer. He competed in the individual and team foil events at the 2004 Summer Olympics.

References

External links
 

1982 births
Living people
Egyptian male foil fencers
Olympic fencers of Egypt
Fencers at the 2004 Summer Olympics